St Christopher's School (later known as Aurora St Christopher's School) was located in Bristol, England. It was a special needs residential independent school for around 50 children and young people aged 7 to 25,
who had severe and complex learning difficulties, or profound and multiple learning difficulties. They all had specific requirements for their care and education.

Many of the pupils had language and communication disorders, some had physical disabilities and some displayed challenging behaviour. Some of the additional conditions were autism spectrum disorder, epilepsy, Rett syndrome and Angelman syndrome.

In December 2015 it was announced that the school was to close, but in January 2016 it was taken over by The Aurora Group, allowing it to remain open. However the school did close in 2020.

References

External links

Defunct schools in Bristol
Educational institutions established in 1945
1945 establishments in England
Educational institutions disestablished in 2020
2020 disestablishments in England
Defunct special schools in England